Chosen (stylized onscreen as CH:OS:EN accompanied by a ticking sound) is an American action thriller drama television series/web series from Ben Ketai and Ryan Lewis, airing via online streaming video service Crackle. The first season consisted of eight episodes released simultaneously, on January 17, 2013. On April 30, 2014, Crackle renewed the series for a fourth season, which has yet to air. , 18 episodes of Chosen have aired, concluding the third season.

Series overview
{| class="wikitable" style="text-align: center;"
|-
! style="padding: 0 8px;" colspan="2" rowspan="2"| Season
! style="padding: 0 8px;" rowspan="2"| Episodes
! colspan="2"| Originally aired
|-
! First aired
! Last aired
|-
 |style="background:#FF5F5F"|
 |1
 |6
 |
 |
|-
 |style="background:#0635C8"|
 |2
 |6
 |style="padding: 0 8px"|
 |style="padding: 0 8px"|
|-
 |style="background:#056608"|
 |3
 |6
 |
 |
|}

Episodes

Season 1 (2013)

Season 2 (2013)

Season 3 (2014)

Season 4
On April 30, 2014, Crackle announced they had renewed the series for a fourth season. It was initially scheduled to premiere in the winter of 2016, but on June 20, 2016, Milo Ventimiglia tweeted there is a slim chance the series will actually make a return.

References

External links

Chosen